In military terms, 7th Group may refer to:

 7th Operations Group (U.S. Air Force)
 7th Support Group (United Kingdom)
 7th Special Forces Group (United States)
 7th Psychological Operations Group
 7th Carrier Air Group (UK Fleet Air Arm)

See also
 7th Division (disambiguation)
 7th Brigade (disambiguation)
 7th Regiment (disambiguation)
 7th Squadron (disambiguation)